The dimension of a space or object is informally defined as the minimum number of coordinates needed to specify any point within it.

Dimension or dimensions may also refer to:

Arts and entertainment

Film and television
Dimension (film)
Dimensions (animation), a French animation project focusing on mathematics
Dimensions (2011 film), a British science fiction film
Dimensions (2018 film), a Burmese action film
Dimensions (TV series), an Australian magazine style program later renamed George Negus Tonight
Dimension Films, a movie company and subsidiary of The Weinstein Company

Music
Dimension (musician), the stage name of English record producer Robert Etheridge
"Dimension" (song), the song by Wolfmother
Dimension Records, a record label

Albums
Dimensions (Believer album)
Dimensions, an album by The Box Tops
Dimensions (Freedom Call album)
Dimensions (Maynard Ferguson album)
Dimensions (McCoy Tyner album)
Dimensions (Octurn album)
Dimensions (Wolfmother), an EP

Other uses in arts and entertainment
Dimensions, characters in the video game Rockman & Forte: Challenger from the Future
Parallel universes in fiction, or Parallel dimensions, hypothetical self-contained realities co-existing with one's own
Lego Dimensions, a Lego-themed toys-to-life video game

Mathematics
Dimension (graph theory), a property of undirected graphs related to their representations in spaces
Dimension (vector space), a property of vector spaces
Bipartite dimension, an intrinsic property of undirected graphs
Fractal dimension, a property of fractals
Global dimension, a homological property of mathematical rings
Krull dimension, an ideal property of mathematical rings
Order dimension, a property of partially ordered sets
Dimension of an algebraic variety
Dimension theory (algebra)
One of several properties of topological spaces:
Complex dimension
Hausdorff dimension
Inductive dimension
Lebesgue covering dimension
Packing dimension
Isoperimetric dimension

Science
Measurements of objects can be referred to as dimensions
Dimension (metadata), in information science
Dimension (physical quantity), the basic quantities measured (length, time, ...)

Other uses
Dell Dimension, a desktop computer line
Dimension (data warehouse), a business database structure
Dimension (herbicide), a weed control chemical for lawns and gardens
Plane (esotericism), a state of consciousness said to transcend the physical universe
Dimensions UK, a learning disabilities charitable society

See also
 
Size